60th New York Film Critics Circle Awards
January 22, 1995

Best Picture:
 Quiz Show 
The 60th New York Film Critics Circle Awards honored the best filmmaking of 1994. The winners were announced on 15 December 1994 and the awards were given on 22 January 1995.

Winners
Best Actor:
Paul Newman - Nobody's Fool
Runner-up: Samuel L. Jackson - Pulp Fiction
Best Actress:
Linda Fiorentino - The Last Seduction
Runner-up: Jodie Foster - Nell
Best Cinematography:
Stefan Czapsky - Ed Wood
Best Director:
Quentin Tarantino - Pulp Fiction
Runner-up: Krzysztof Kieślowski - Red (Trois couleurs: Rouge)
Best Documentary:
Hoop Dreams
Best Film:
Quiz Show
Runner-up: Pulp Fiction
Best Foreign Language Film:
Red (Trois couleurs: Rouge) • France/Switzerland/Poland
Best New Director
Darnell Martin - I Like It Like That
Runners-up: Kevin Smith - Clerks and David O. Russell - Spanking the Monkey
Best Screenplay:
Quentin Tarantino and Roger Avery - Pulp Fiction
Runner-up: Paul Attanasio - Quiz Show
Best Supporting Actor:
Martin Landau - Ed Wood
Runner-up: Paul Scofield - Quiz Show
Best Supporting Actress:
Dianne Wiest - Bullets over Broadway
Runners-up: Uma Thurman - Pulp Fiction and Alfre Woodard - Crooklyn
Special Award:
Jean-Luc Godard

References

External links
1994 Awards

1994
New York Film Critics Circle Awards
1994 in American cinema
New York
1994 in New York City